Bloomington Central station is a light rail station on the Metro Blue Line in the Twin Cities region of the U.S. state of Minnesota.

The area surrounding the station was formerly the headquarters of Control Data Corporation. The company's largest office tower still remains and is now the headquarters of HealthPartners.  

Immediately to the east of HealthPartners is The Reflections Condominiums, two 17-story residential towers with over 260 dwelling units between them. The Reflections towers were developed by McGough Development and the remainder of the land is now being redeveloped by same as a transit-oriented development including residential dwellings, a hotel, office, and retail space.

The platform of Bloomington Central Station has the first 17 Fibonacci numbers written in binary using different colored bricks.

References

External links 
Metro Transit: Bloomington Central Station
City of Bloomington - Bloomington Central Station development

Railway stations in the United States opened in 2004
2004 establishments in Minnesota
Metro Blue Line (Minnesota) stations in Hennepin County, Minnesota